Merry Hell is an unincorporated community in Simpson County, Mississippi, in the United States.

History
Merry Hell was so named from the family feuds of the early Scottish settlers.

References

Unincorporated communities in Simpson County, Mississippi
Unincorporated communities in Mississippi